The El Paso Rumble were a charter member of the original Intense Football League of 2004.  They played at the El Paso County Coliseum in El Paso, Texas.  They only played for one year. They were winless at 0-16. The team nearly earned their only win in San Angelo, Texas (first Saturday of August 2004) against the San Angelo Stampede, but on the last play of the game, a high snap caused the game-winning field goal attempt to be wide right and the Rumble lost 23-22.

When the league originally folded, other teams joined different leagues, like the af2 and the National Indoor Football League.  However, the Rumble was unable to sign up with another league; as a result, the team ceased all operations entirely.

A new El Paso team joined the IFL, with gameplay beginning in 2009. Like the old Rumble, the new team, whose identity was known as the Generals, played at the Coliseum and folded after one year when the owner was unable to keep the team afloat due to personal issues even after a very successful year at 14-3.

Intense Football League teams
American football teams in El Paso, Texas
Defunct American football teams in Texas
2004 establishments in Texas
2004 disestablishments in Texas
American football teams established in 2004
American football teams disestablished in 2004